BYU AdLab is an American advertising agency housed within the College of Fine Arts and Communications at Brigham Young University (BYU) in Provo, Utah. Founded by Jeff Sheets and Doug McKinlay, it is one of only a few university-sponsored advertising agencies in the world.

History
Founded in 2003, the BYU AdLab first gained prominence with a campaign for the Office of the National Drug Control Policy portraying pictures of teenagers who made the choice themselves to say no to drugs. Jeff Sheets then realized that students didn't need fake assignments, but that work in the real world would be even more effective. The AdLab receives no funding from BYU, but generates all money from client projects. BYU AdLab now produces advertising campaigns for numerous national clients.  BYU Adlab students have gone on to work for Wieden+Kennedy, Crispin Porter + Bogusky, Goodby, Silverstein & Partners and McCann Erickson.

Awards
The BYU AdLab has collected numerous awards and press mentions since being established. In 2019 the AdLab was named the top college advertising program in the country by College Magazine. The BYU AdLab won the Student Gold ADDY Award for the Dorito's Nemesis campaign, one of only eight gold awards awarded by the American Advertising Federation from more than 60,000 applicants.

References

External links
 Official Website

Advertising agencies of the United States
Adlab
2003 establishments in Utah
Mass media companies established in 2003
Marketing companies established in 2003
Companies based in Provo, Utah